Air Chief Marshal Sir Charles John Thomson,  (7 June 1941 – 10 July 1994), usually Sir John Thomson, was a senior officer in the Royal Air Force (RAF).

RAF service
Educated at Campbell College in Belfast, Thomson entered Royal Air Force College Cranwell in 1959, and was commissioned into the Royal Air Force in 1962.

Thomson was appointed Officer Commanding (OC) No. 41 Squadron in 1976, Personal Staff Officer to the Chief of the Air Staff in 1979, and Station Commander at RAF Bruggen in 1981. He went on to be Director of Defence Concepts at the Ministry of Defence (MoD) in 1985, Air Officer Commanding (AOC) No. 1 Group in 1987 and Assistant Chief of the Air Staff in 1989. He became Air Officer Commanding-in-Chief (AOCinC) at Support Command in 1991, and Air Officer Commanding-in-Chief at Strike Command in 1992.

In July 1994, Thomson became the first Commander in Chief of the new NATO command, Allied Forces North-Western Europe. However, only days after taking up this post, he became ill and was rushed to the military hospital at RAF Halton where he died aged 53.

Family
In 1972, Thomson married Jan Bishop; they had two daughters, and one daughter who died aged 3.

Sir John Thomson Memorial Sword
The Sir John Thomson Memorial Sword commemorates his military life. Thomson was a leading member and strong supporter of the Air Squadron, and regularly flew cadets on Air Squadron Day and on Air Experience Flights (AEFs). The Sword is awarded each year to the cadet judged to be the Best in the Combined Cadet Force (RAF) (CCF). Cadets, who will commonly be the most senior in their schools contingent, will have to demonstrate the highest level of CCF commitment and involvement, during their time in the CCF and will also be highly regarded within their school/college. Nominations are called for in November of each year.  Of those recommended by either their Contingent Commander or RAF Section Commander, six would be chosen for a final interview with wing commander CCF in either late January or early February; as a result of which a winner would be chosen. Results are made public in late March, and the Sword is awarded at the Air Squadron Day celebrations at the end of the summer term. All six finalists, who would all attend the parade on Air Squadron Day, would be awarded a Geoffrey de Havilland Flying Foundation Medal for CCF Achievement in recognition of getting that far.

Other honours
On 10 July 2014, a wreath-laying ceremony was held at the United States Air Force Memorial in Arlington, Virginia, to commemorate the 20th anniversary of his passing, and to honour Thomson's life and service to the Royal Air Force.

References

|-

|-

|-

1941 births
People educated at Campbell College
Graduates of the Royal Air Force College Cranwell
British military personnel of the Aden Emergency
Royal Air Force air marshals
Recipients of the Air Force Cross (United Kingdom)
Knights Grand Cross of the Order of the Bath
Commanders of the Order of the British Empire
1994 deaths